Branford may refer to:

Branford Boase Award, British literary award
Branford Marsalis Quartet, an American jazz band 
Operation Branford, a British raid conducted in 1942 during WW2

Places
Branford, Connecticut, a town in the United States
Branford Center, Connecticut, a neighborhood in Branford, Connecticut
Branford Connector, a state road in Branford, Connecticut
Branford Hall Career Institute, a private career college in Branford, Connecticut 
Branford High School (Connecticut), a school district in Branford, Connecticut
Branford Land Trust, an organization in Branford, Connecticut
Branford Point Historic District, a historical district in Branford, Connecticut
Branford station, a railroad station in Branford
Branford Town Hall, the town hall in Branford, Connecticut
North Branford, Connecticut, a town in New Haven, Connecticut
North Branford Center Historic District, historic district in North Branford, Connecticut
North Branford High School, school district in North Branford, Connecticut
Branford Steam Railroad, a railroad in North Branford, Connecticut
Branford, Florida, a town in the United States
Branford High School (Florida), the only public high school in Branford, Florida
Branford College, a residential college at Yale University
Branford House, a summer home in Groton, Connecticut
Branford-Horry House, a house in Charleston, South Carolina
Branford Price Millar Library, a University library in Portland, Oregon

People

Given name
Branford Clarke (1885-1947), English evangelical preacher
Branford Marsalis (born 1960), American jazz musician
Branford Taitt (1938-2013), Barbadian politician

Middle name
William Shubrick (1790-1874), American Navy officer

Surname
Frederick Victor Branford (1892-1941), British poet
Henrietta Branford (1946-1999), English author
Robert Branford (born 1993), Australian speedway rider
Victor Branford (1863-1930), British sociologist

Fictional characters
Terra Branford, character from Final Fantasy VI

See also
Brantford (disambiguation)